Platycheirus angustatus is a species of hoverfly. It is found in many parts of the Palearctic, and in the Nearctic.

Description
External images
For terms, see: Morphology of Diptera.

Wing length: . Notopleurae and anepisternum shiny. Tergites 2 and 3 are much longer than wide; spots on tergite 3 at least 4/5 length of tergite; femur 1: some long black hairs suddenly bent at tip. The male genitalia are figured by Goeldlin et al (1990). The larva is described and figured by Rotheray (1988)  See references for determination.

Distribution
Palearctic: Fennoscandia south to North Spain, Ireland east through North Europe and Central Europe, European Russia to Siberia  and the Pacific coast (Sakhalin Is.) Nearctic:
Alaska to Quebec and south to Washington.

Biology
Habitat: wetland fen, marsh unimproved grassland subject to seasonal flooding. Flowers visited include Cyperaceae, Graminae, Aegopodium, Leontodon, Lycopus europaeus, Polygonum cuspidatum, Ranunculus, Rubus fruticosus. Flies
May to September. The larva feeds on aphids.

References

Diptera of Europe
Diptera of North America
Syrphinae
Insects described in 1843